Estadio Olimpico Jose Simon Azcona is a stadium located in Tegucigalpa, Honduras. The stadium is located inside the Olympic complex Jose Simon Azcona. It is named after the ex-Honduran president José Azcona del Hoyo.

Olimpico Jose Simon Azcona, Estadio